The Never Ending Tour is the popular name for Bob Dylan's endless touring schedule since June 7, 1988.

Background
Six concerts taking place in Italy were announced by ticketone.it on November 7, 2017. Further concerts in Portugal, Spain, Switzerland, Germany, Austria and the Czech Republic were released over the following week.

On March 15 it was announced by Billboard that Dylan and his band would be headlining the Fuji Rock Festival in Japan. Almost two months later further dates in Asia were announced along with a tour of Australia and New Zealand. On August 3 a final show in Sydney was scheduled to take place at the Enmore Theatre, his first performance at the venue.

On May 25 a single concert was announced at Thackerville's WinStar World Casino Global Event Center and on August 3 a further four concerts were added to Dylan's Fall touring schedule. A further twenty-three concerts were announced on August 6.

Set list
This set list is representative of the performance on April 16, 2018 in Vienna, Austria. It does not represent the set list at all concerts for the duration of the tour.

"Things Have Changed"
"Don't Think Twice, It's All Right"
"Highway 61 Revisited"
"Simple Twist of Fate"
"Duquesne Whistle"
"Melancholy Mood"
"Honest With Me"
"Tryin' to Get to Heaven"
"Come Rain or Come Shine"
"Pay in Blood"
"Tangled Up in Blue"
"Early Roman Kings"
"Desolation Row"
"Love Sick"
"Autumn Leaves"
"Thunder on the Mountain"
"Soon After Midnight"
"Long and Wasted Years"
Encore
"Blowin' in the Wind"
"Ballad of a Thin Man"

Tour dates

Notes

References

External links
BobLinks – Comprehensive log of concerts and set lists
BobDylan.com – Bob Dylan's Official Website Tour Page
Bjorner's Still on the Road – Information on recording sessions and performances

Bob Dylan concert tours
2018 concert tours